Pedlow Skate Park is a skatepark in the Encino neighborhood of Los Angeles, California. It was the first public skatepark in Los Angeles when it opened to the public on February 17, 2001, and was later reopened in August 2006 after extensive work and new features. It has hosted events such as the 2013 Southern California Summer Skateboarding Expo and OG Jam competitions

References

External links
 Official website

Skateparks in the United States
Encino, Los Angeles